Navigation is the theory and practice of navigating, especially the charting of a course for a ship, aircraft, or spaceship. 

Navigation may also refer to:
 Marine navigation — see navigation
 Land navigation
 Air navigation
 Ship transport in general
 Web navigation, the process of browsing and locating information using the hypertext of the World Wide Web
 Navigation system, a system, usually electronic, that aids in navigation
 A man-made watercourse similar to a  canal
 Navigation (album), the 2005 debut album by the Irish band Radar
 Navigation: The OMD B-Sides, a 2001 compilation album by Orchestral Manoeuvres in the Dark
 "Navigation", the title track of this compilation, originally the B-side of 1982 single "Maid of Orleans"
 Navigation (film), a documentary film directed by Hossein Rajabian
 Navigational (album), an album by Centro-Matic

See also
 Navigation (journal)
 Navigator, the person on board a ship or aircraft responsible for its navigation
 Navigability
 Navigation research, which deals with the fundamental aspects of navigation
 Navigation authority, a company or statutory body which is concerned with the management of a navigable canal or river
 Navvy, a navigational engineer